The Brotherhood of Satan is a 1971 American supernatural horror film directed by Bernard McEveety, written by L. Q. Jones, and starring Jones, Alvy Moore, Strother Martin, and Ahna Capri. It follows a man who, while traveling through the American Southwest with his young daughter and girlfriend, encounter a small town where a coven of Satanists are kidnapping the local children to transfer their souls into their bodies.

Plot
Widowed Ben Holden, his young daughter, K. T., and his glamorous girlfriend, Nicky, are on a road trip through the American Southwest. On a sharp corner along the highway, they spot a smoldering demolished car along with what appears to be human remains. Ben quickly drives to the nearest town of Hillsboro to report the incident, but upon arriving, is attacked by the town sheriff, Pete, while the town residents hide in their homes and observe the scene. Pete releases Ben, and the family flee.

Unbeknownst to Ben, the town is on edge because 26 of its residents have met violent deaths in the past three days, and numerous children have disappeared. Pete, his deputy Tobey, and the town physician, Dr. Duncan, travel to the wreckage. They find that the two adult drivers were killed, but that their young son, Timmy—also a resident of Hillsboro—is nowhere to be found. Meanwhile, as Ben flees Hillsboro, he is startled by a young girl who appears in the road, and crashes his car. With nowhere to go, he, Nicky, and K. T. head back toward Hillsboro on foot.

That night, resident Ed Meadows and his wife, Mildred, are inexplicably killed in their home after one of their daughter's dolls apparently comes to life. Meanwhile, at the abandoned Barry house overlooking the town, Dr. Duncan gathers in a secret room with numerous elderly residents—they are in fact a coven of witches who worship Satan, and Dr. Duncan is their leader. During their ceremony, the elders marvel at numerous children who stand entranced on pedestals, vessels into which the witches plan to transfer their souls. Shortly after, Ed's son Stuart, and daughter, Phyllis, join a group of children outside their home, who escort them to the Barry house.

Ben, Nicky, and K. T. reach the Meadows home, and find Ed and Mildred's corpses. In town, Ben and his family are welcomed to spend the night at Pete's home, where Dr. Duncan makes an unannounced visit. Meanwhile, Jack, the town's Catholic priest, suspects there is evil abounding, and stays up late into the night researching devil worship. In his studies, he notices a preponderance of children figuring in the literature. Back at Pete's house, Nicky suffers a disturbing nightmare. In the morning, Ben decides they should leave. Peter offers them to borrow his car, but they get a flat tire on the edge of town. When they exit the car, Ben and Nicky realize that K. T. has vanished from the backseat.

K. T. joins the town's children at the Barry house, where they play with toys and other party favors in a room decorated with murals of dead children and cloaked figures. Ben and Nicky return to town to report K. T. missing, and are met by Father Jack, who tells them she has been kidnapped by witches, who he believes will use her in a ritual along with the town's other missing children. Meanwhile, Mike, another local resident, finds his son Joey wandering out of their home in a trance. He runs after him into the woods, where he is decapitated by an armored figure riding a horse. Father Jack witnesses the incident, and flees in terror to report it to Pete, Ben, and Tobey.

Now having acquired a child for each member of the coven, Dr. Duncan begins the ritual at the Barry house, entreating Satan to help transfer their souls into the bodies of the young. Meanwhile, Ben, Pete, Tobey, and Father Jack unite and rush to the Barry house. Outside, Pete finds a toy horseman lying on the ground, with a blood-covered lance. This terrifies Father Jack, who realizes that the coven have been causing the children's toys to manifest as instruments to kill their parents. The men quickly break into the house, but find they have arrived too late—the witches have all perished, and their souls transferred into the children. When Ben, Pete, and Tobey break down the door to the ceremonial room, they find K. T. and the other children gathered around a cobweb-covered table, along with dolls resembling some of the coven members. The children stare at the men in silence.

Cast

Production
The Brotherhood of Satan was filmed in Albuquerque, New Mexico in August 1969.

Novel adaptation
A book adaptation, titled The Brotherhood of Satan, by L. Q. Jones was published by Universal-Award in 1980.

Release
The Brotherhood of Satan was released theatrically on August 6, 1971, premiering in New York City.

Home media
The Brotherhood of Satan was released on VHS in 1986 by RCA/Columbia Pictures Home Video.  A DVD version was released in 2002 by Columbia TriStar Home Entertainment, in 2013 the film was released by Mill Creek Entertainment on a double feature Blu-ray with Mr. Sardonicus. and in 2021 released again to Blu-ray from Arrow Films.

The film is also available for streaming video rental and digital download through Amazon, Apple's iTunes Store and Vudu.

In popular culture
The industrial dance group, My Life With The Thrill Kill Kult, sampled The Brotherhood of Satan in the song "Rivers of Blood, Years of Darkness" from their 1990 Confessions of a Knife album.

See also
List of American films of 1971

References

External links

1971 horror films
American supernatural horror films
Columbia Pictures films
Films about consciousness transfer
Films about cults
Films about Satanism
Films about witchcraft
Films directed by Bernard McEveety Jr.
Films shot in New Mexico
1970s English-language films
1970s American films